Werner Klumpp (12 November 1928 – 8 January 2021) was a German politician of the FDP. Klumpp was born in Baiersbronn, Württemberg, Germany. After the death of Franz-Josef Röder he was the interim Minister President of the Saarland (26 June 1979 to 5 July 1979).

References

1928 births
2021 deaths
People from Freudenstadt (district)
People from the Free People's State of Württemberg
Free Democratic Party (Germany) politicians
Ministers-President of Saarland
Members of the Landtag of Saarland
Commanders Crosses of the Order of Merit of the Federal Republic of Germany